Lexington County School District may refer to:
 Lexington County School District One
 Lexington County School District Two
 Lexington County School District Three
 Lexington & Richland County School District Five